Chimbu Airport  is an airport serving Kundiawa, the capital of the Simbu Province in Papua New Guinea.

Airlines and destinations

References

External links
 

Airports in Papua New Guinea
Chimbu Province